Jonathan Woodard (born September 19, 1993) is a former American football defensive end. He was drafted by the Jacksonville Jaguars in the seventh round of the 2016 NFL Draft. He played college football at Central Arkansas.

Professional career

Jacksonville Jaguars
Woodard was drafted by the Jacksonville Jaguars in the seventh round (226th overall) of the 2016 NFL Draft. On May 23, 2016, he suffered a torn Achilles tendon during team workouts. He underwent surgery the same day, and missed his entire rookie season. On September 2, 2017, Woodard was waived by the Jaguars.

Atlanta Falcons
On October 11, 2017, Woodard was signed to the Atlanta Falcons' practice squad. He was released by the team on October 24, 2017.

Miami Dolphins
On December 5, 2017, Woodard was signed to the Miami Dolphins' practice squad. He signed a reserve/future contract with the Dolphins on January 1, 2018.

On September 1, 2018, Woodard was waived by the Dolphins and was signed to the practice squad the next day. He was promoted to the active roster on September 26, 2018.

On August 11, 2019, Woodard was waived/injured by the Dolphins and placed on injured reserve. He was waived from injured reserve on December 24, 2019.

Buffalo Bills
On January 1, 2020, Woodard was signed to the Buffalo Bills practice squad. He signed a reserve/future contract with the Bills on January 6, 2020. He was waived on August 5, 2020.

Saskatchewan Roughriders
Woodard signed with the Saskatchewan Roughriders of the CFL on May 20, 2021.

Kansas City Chiefs
On February 7, 2022, Woodard signed a reserve/future contract with the Kansas City Chiefs. He was waived on May 5, 2022.

References

External links
Central Arkansas Bears bio

1993 births
Living people
American football defensive ends
Atlanta Falcons players
Buffalo Bills players
Central Arkansas Bears football players
Jacksonville Jaguars players
Kansas City Chiefs players
Miami Dolphins players
People from Brentwood, Tennessee
Players of American football from Tennessee
Saskatchewan Roughriders players